Renealmia oligotricha is a species of plant in the family Zingiberaceae. It is endemic to Ecuador.  Its natural habitats are subtropical or tropical moist lowland forests and subtropical or tropical moist montane forests.

References

Endemic flora of Ecuador
oligotricha
Vulnerable plants
Taxonomy articles created by Polbot